This is a list of kingdoms and royal dynasties, organized by geographic region.

Note: many countries have had multiple dynasties over the course of recorded history. This is not a comprehensively exhaustive list and may require further additions or historical verification.

Africa

Burundi

Kingdom of Burundi
German East Africa
Ruanda-Urundi

Chad

Kanem Empire
Duguwa dynasty
Sayfawa dynasty
Bornu Empire
Kingdom of Baguirmi
Wadai Empire

Egypt

First Dynasty of Egypt
Second Dynasty of Egypt
Third Dynasty of Egypt
Old Kingdom
Fourth Dynasty of Egypt
Fifth Dynasty of Egypt
Sixth Dynasty of Egypt
First Intermediate Period of Egypt
Seventh Dynasty of Egypt
Eighth Dynasty of Egypt
Ninth Dynasty of Egypt
Tenth Dynasty of Egypt
Eleventh Dynasty of Egypt 
Middle Kingdom of Egypt
Twelfth Dynasty of Egypt
Thirteenth Dynasty of Egypt
Fourteenth Dynasty of Egypt
Fifteenth Dynasty of Egypt
Second Intermediate Period of Egypt
Sixteenth Dynasty of Egypt
Abydos dynasty
Seventeenth Dynasty of Egypt
New Kingdom of Egypt
Eighteenth Dynasty of Egypt
Nineteenth Dynasty of Egypt
Twentieth Dynasty of Egypt
Third Intermediate Period of Egypt
Twenty-first Dynasty of Egypt
Twenty-second Dynasty of Egypt
Twenty-third Dynasty of Egypt
Twenty-fourth Dynasty of Egypt
Twenty-fifth Dynasty of Egypt
Late Period of ancient Egypt
Twenty-sixth Dynasty of Egypt
Twenty-seventh Dynasty of Egypt
Twenty-eighth Dynasty of Egypt
Twenty-ninth Dynasty of Egypt
Thirtieth Dynasty of Egypt
Thirty-first Dynasty of Egypt
Ptolemaic Kingdom
Ptolemaic dynasty
Roman Egypt
Diocese of Egypt
Sasanian Egypt
Ayyubid dynasty
Mamluk Sultanate
Tulunids
Ikhshidid dynasty
Egypt Eyalet
Muhammad Ali dynasty
Khedivate of Egypt
Sultanate of Egypt
Kingdom of Egypt

Ethiopia

Harla Kingdom
Sultanate of Showa
Sultanate of Dawaro
Kingdom of Damot
Zagwe dynasty 
Sultanate of Ifat 
Walashma dynasty 
Ennarea 
Ethiopian Empire 
Solomonic dynasty
Kingdom of Kaffa
Sultanate of Harar
Imamate of Aussa
Emirate of Harar 
Sultanate of Aussa
Italian East Africa

Ghana

Dagbon Kingdom
Bono state
Portuguese Gold Coast 
Swedish Gold Coast
Brandenburger Gold Coast
Asante Kingdom
British Gold Coast

Libya

Battiadae
Libya (satrapy)
Africa (Roman province)
Aghlabids
Spanish Tripoli
Hospitaller Tripoli
Ottoman Tripolitania
Karamanli dynasty
Italian Tripolitania
Italian Cyrenaica
Italian Libya
British Military Administration (Libya)
Emirate of Cyrenaica
Kingdom of Libya

Madagascar

Merina Kingdom
Boina Kingdom

Mali

Keita dynasty
Mali Empire
Songhai Empire
Sunni dynasty
Askiya dynasty
Bamana Empire
Kénédougou Kingdom
Massina Empire
Toucouleur Empire
Wassoulou Empire

Mauritania

Ghana Empire

Mauritius

Isle de France (Mauritius) (1715–1792) (1804–1810)
British Mauritius
Mauritius (1968–1992)

Morocco

Mauretania
Mauretania Tingitana
Iulia Constantia Zilil
Iulia Valentia Banasa
Iulia Campestris Babba
Ptolemaic dynasty
Kingdom of Nekor
Barghawata
Midrarid dynasty
Idrisid dynasty
Almoravid dynasty
Almohad Caliphate
Marinid Sultanate
Wattasid dynasty
Saadi Sultanate
Alaouite dynasty
Spanish protectorate in Morocco
Morocco

Nigeria

Bornu Empire
Kanem Empire
OVIE of Emevor
Oba of Benin
Obi
Fulani Empire
Ooduan dynasties of Yorubaland

Senegal

Jolof Empire

South Africa

 List of Xhosa Chiefs
 List of Xhosa Kings
 Zulu Kingdom

Tunisia

Hafsid dynasty
List of Beys of Tunis
Husainid dynasty
Kingdom of Tunisia

Asia

Afghanistan

 Kingdom of Afghanistan
 Mohammed Zahir Shah, The Last King of Afghanistan

Bhutan

 House of Wangchuck
 His Majesty the King of Bhutan

Cambodia

 Kingdom of Cambodia

China

The following is a list of major dynasties of China:

 Xia dynasty (夏朝) (2070–1600 BC)
 Shang dynasty (商朝) (1600–1046 BC)
 Zhou dynasty (周朝) (1046–256 BC)
 Western Zhou (西周) (1046–771 BC)
 Eastern Zhou (東周) (770–256 BC)
 Qin dynasty (秦朝) (221–207 BC)
 Han dynasty (漢朝) (202 BC–AD 9, AD 25–220)
 Western Han (西漢) (202 BC–AD 9)
 Eastern Han (東漢) (25–220)
 Xin dynasty (新朝) (9–23)
 Three Kingdoms (三國) (220–280)
 Cao Wei (曹魏) (220–280)
 Shu Han (蜀漢) (221–263)
 Eastern Wu (東吳) (222–280)
 Jin dynasty (晉朝) (266–420)
 Western Jin (西晉) (266–316)
 Eastern Jin (東晉) (317–420)
 Sixteen Kingdoms (十六國) (304–439)
 Han Zhao (漢趙) (304–329)
 Cheng Han (成漢) (304–347)
 Later Zhao (後趙) (319–351)
 Former Liang (前涼) (320–376)
 Former Yan (前燕) (337–370)
 Former Qin (前秦) (351–394)
 Later Yan (後燕) (384–409)
 Later Qin (後秦) (384–417)
 Western Qin (西秦) (385–400, 409–431)
 Later Liang (後涼) (386–403)
 Southern Liang (南涼) (397–414)
 Northern Liang (北涼) (397–439)
 Southern Yan (南燕) (398–410)
 Western Liang (西涼) (400–421)
 Hu Xia (胡夏) (407–431)
 Northern Yan (北燕) (407–436)
 Northern and Southern dynasties (南北朝) (386–589)
 Northern dynasties (北朝) (386–581)
 Northern Wei (北魏) (386–535)
 Eastern Wei (東魏) (534–550)
 Western Wei (西魏) (535–557)
 Northern Qi (北齊) (550–577)
 Northern Zhou (北周) (557–581)
 Southern dynasties (南朝) (420–589)
 Liu Song (劉宋) (420–479)
 Southern Qi (南齊) (479–502)
 Liang dynasty (梁朝) (502–557)
 Chen dynasty (陳朝) (557–589)
 Sui dynasty (隋朝) (581–619)
 Tang dynasty (唐朝) (618–690, 705–907)
 Wu Zhou (武周) (690–705)
 Five Dynasties and Ten Kingdoms (五代十國) (907–979)
 Five Dynasties (五代) (907–960)
 Later Liang (後梁) (907–923)
 Later Tang (後唐) (923–937)
 Later Jin (後晉) (936–947)
 Later Han (後漢) (947–951)
 Later Zhou (後周) (951–960)
 Ten Kingdoms (十國) (907–979)
 Former Shu (前蜀) (907–925)
 Yang Wu (楊吳) (907–937)
 Ma Chu (馬楚) (907–951)
 Wuyue (吳越) (907–978)
 Min (閩) (909–945)
 Southern Han (南漢) (917–971)
 Jingnan (荊南) (924–963)
 Later Shu (後蜀) (934–965)
 Southern Tang (南唐) (937–976)
 Northern Han (北漢) (951–979)
 Liao dynasty (遼朝) (916–1125)
 Western Liao (西遼) (1124–1218)
 Song dynasty (宋朝) (960–1279)
 Northern Song (北宋) (960–1127)
 Southern Song (南宋) (1127–1279)
 Western Xia (西夏) (1038–1227)
 Jin dynasty (金朝) (1115–1234)
 Yuan dynasty (元朝) (1271–1368)
 Northern Yuan (北元) (1368–1635)
 Ming dynasty (明朝) (1368–1644)
 Southern Ming (南明) (1644–1662)
 Qing dynasty (清朝) (1636–1912)
 Later Jin (後金) (1616–1636)

Israel

Davidic line
Kingdom of Judah
List of Kings of Judah
King Saul
King Solomon
Tribe of Judah
Kingdom of Israel (united monarchy)
Kingdom of Israel (Samaria) 
Hasmonean Kingdom
Herodian Kingdom
Kingdom of Jerusalem

India
Yaduvanshi dynasty
Yadava dynasty
Abhira dynasty
Pala dynasty (Kamarupa)
Kachari Kingdom
Mlechchha dynasty
Koch dynasty
Khen dynasty
Chutia Kingdom
Danava dynasty
Bhauma dynasty
Varman dynasty
Ahom kingdom
Gajapati Empire
Mahameghavahana dynasty
Eastern Ganga dynasty
Rashtrakuta dynasty
Sena dynasty
Shunga Empire
Chola dynasty
Chera dynasty
Kamarupa kingdom
Kamata kingdom
Pallava dynasty
Rajput dynasties
Sukarchakiya dynasty
Soomra dynasty
Maurya empire 
Manikya dynasty
Mughal empire 
Pandiyan dynasty
Satavahana dynasty
Vijaynagar Empire 
Maratha Empire
Gupta dynasty
Chalukya dynasty
Delhi Sultanate
Tuluva dynasty
Dominion of India

Iran

 House of Pahlavi
 Qajar dynasty
 Pahlavi dynasty
 Safavid dynasty
 Zand dynasty
 Afsharid dynasty
 Sasanid dynasty
 Arsacid dynasty
 Achaemenid dynasty

Iraq

 Iraqi Constitutional Monarchy
 Kingdom of Iraq (1932–58)
 List of kings of Iraq

Japan

 Imperial House of Japan – Also known as the Yamato dynasty

Jordan
 List of kings of Jordan
 Kingdom of Iraq (1932–58)

Korea

Goguryeo Kingdom
Baekje Kingdom 
Silla Kingdom
Unified Silla Kingdom
Goryeo dynasty
Joseon dynasty
Korean Empire
List of monarchs of Korea
Kim dynasty (as a republic but in hereditary dictatorship context)

Kuwait

 List of emirs of Kuwait

Laos

 List of monarchs of Laos
 Kingdom of Laos
 Sisavang Vatthana – Last king of Laos

Mongolia

 List of Mongol Khans
 Mongol Empire

Myanmar

 Konbaung dynasty
 List of Burmese monarchs
 Thibaw Min – The last King of Burma

Nepal

 32 Kirat Kings who ruled in Kathmandu Valley
 Gyanendra of Nepal – King of Nepal
 Shah dynasty

Oman

 List of rulers of Oman

Saudi Arabia

 King of Saudi Arabia
 House of Saud
 Abbasid dynasty
 Umayyad dynasty

Thailand
 Chakri dynasty
 Monarchy of Thailand
 List of Thai monarchs

United Arab Emirates
 Rulers of UAE
 House of Al-Falasi
 Al Nahyan family
 Al Qasimi
 Al Nuaim
 Al Sharqi

Vietnam

 Hồng Bàng dynasty (2879–258 BC)
 Early Lý dynasty (AD 544–602)
 Ngô dynasty (AD 939–965)
 Đinh dynasty (AD 968–980)
 Early Lê dynasty (AD 980–1009)
 Lý dynasty (AD 1009–1225)
 Trần dynasty (AD 1225–1400)
 Hồ dynasty (AD 1400–1407)
 Later Trần dynasty (AD 1407–1413)
 Later Lê dynasty (AD 1428–1527, AD 1533–1789)
 Mạc dynasty (AD 1527–1677)
 Tây Sơn dynasty (AD 1778–1802)
 Nguyễn dynasty (AD 1802–1945)

Europe

Andorra

List of Co-Princes of Andorra

Austria

Archduke Franz Ferdinand of Austria
Austria
 Monarchy

Bavaria

 Kingdom of Bavaria

Belgium

 Monarchy of Belgium

Bohemia

Duchy of Bohemia
Kingdom of Bohemia
Crown of Bohemia
List of rulers of Bohemia

Bulgaria

First Bulgarian Empire
Second Bulgarian Empire
Kingdom of Bulgaria
Bulgarian royal family

Denmark

 Monarchy of Denmark

Finland

Grand Duchy of Finland
List of Finnish monarchs

France

Kingdom of France

Greece

 List of kings of Greece
 List of Greek royal consorts

Georgia

 Bagrationi dynasty
 Kingdom of Georgia

German Empire

 List of German monarchs
 Wilhelm II, German Emperor

Hungary

 Kingdom of Hungary

Italy

Kingdom of Italy
House of Savoy

Liechtenstein

List of Princes of Liechtenstein
Royal House of Liechtenstein

Lithuania

Grand Duchy of Lithuania
Kingdom of Lithuania

Monaco

 Prince of Monaco
 Promotion of the Monegasque Family

Moldova

Principality of Moldavia

Netherlands

Monarchy of the Netherlands
House of Orange-Nassau

Normandy

Duchy of Normandy

Norway

Monarchy of Norway

Luxembourg

 Grand-Duchy of Luxembourg

Poland

 Congress Poland
 Kingdom of Poland (1385–1569)
 List of kings of the Piast dynasty
 List of Polish monarchs

Portugal

 House of Braganza
 Kingdom of Portugal
 Monarchy of the North

Romania
 Kingdom of Romania

Russia
 Alexander II of Russia
 Alexander III of Russia
 Catherine the Great
 House of Romanov
 Ivan the Terrible
 Nicholas II of Russia
 List of Russian rulers
 Peter the Great
 Russian Empire
 Tsardom of Russia

Spain

Royal House of Spain

Andalucía 

Emirate of Córdoba
Emirate of Granada

Aragon 

 Crown of Aragon
 Kingdom of Aragon

Asturias 

Kingdom of Asturias
Prince of Asturias

Cantabria 

Duchy of Cantabria

Catalonia 

 Count of Barcelona
 County of Barcelona
 House of Barcelona
 Principality of Catalonia

Castile 

Crown of Castile
Kingdom of Castile

Galicia 

Kingdom of Galicia

León 

Kingdom of León
List of Leonese monarchs

Majorca 

Kingdom of Majorca

Murcia 

Taifa of Murcia

Navarre 

Kingdom of Navarre

Valencia 

Kingdom of Valencia

Sweden

List of Swedish monarchs

Turkey

Ottoman dynasty

Tuscany

Grand Duchy of Tuscany
House of Habsburg-Lorraine

Two Sicilies

Kingdom of the Two Sicilies
Kingdom of Naples
Kingdom of Sicily
House of Bourbon-Two Sicilies

Ukraine

Kievan Rus
Kingdom of Galicia–Volhynia
Cossack Hetmanate

United Kingdom
 House of Hanover
 House of Saxe-Coburg and Gotha
 House of Windsor
 Monarchy of the United Kingdom

England

 House of Wessex
 House of Knýtlinga
 House of Godwin
 House of Normandy
 House of Plantagenet
 House of Lancaster
 House of York
 House of Tudor
 House of Stuart
 Kingdom of England
 List of English monarchs

Scotland

 Guardian of Scotland
 House of Stuart
 Kingdom of Alba
 Kingdom of Scotland
 List of Scottish monarchs
 Scottish monarchs' family tree

Wales

 King of Wales
 Principality of Wales
 Prince of Wales

Americas

Mosquito Coast

 Miskitu Kingdom

Antigua and Barbuda

Monarchy of Antigua and Barbuda

Bahamas

Monarchy of the Bahamas

Barbados

Monarchy of Barbados

Belize

Monarchy of Belize

Bolivia
Afro-Bolivian monarchy

Brazil
House of Braganza
House of Orléans-Braganza
Brazilian Imperial Family
United Kingdom of Portugal, Brazil and the Algarves
Kingdom of Brazil
Empire of Brazil
Monarquia Brasileira Isabel I of Brazil

Canada

See also Monarchism in Canada
 Monarchist League of Canada
 United Empire Loyalist

Grenada

Monarchy of Grenada

Haiti

Emperor Jacques I of Haiti
Kingdom of Haiti
First Empire of Haiti
Second Empire of Haiti

Jamaica

Monarchy of Jamaica

Mexico

 Aztec Empire
 Emperor of Mexico
 First Mexican Empire
 Second Mexican Empire
 List of Mexican consorts
 List of Tenochtitlan rulers
 House of Iturbide
 House of Habsburg-Lorraine

Peru

 Inca Empire
 Kingdom of Cusco

Saint Kitts and Nevis

Monarchy of Saint Kitts and Nevis

Saint Lucia

Monarchy of Saint Lucia

Saint Vincent and the Grenadines

Monarchy of Saint Vincent and the Grenadines

United States

Fighting Loyalists (American Revolution)
Loyalist (American Revolution)

Oceania

Australia

 Australians for Constitutional Monarchy
 Monarchy of Australia

Hawaii

House of Kamehameha
Kingdom of Hawaii

New Zealand

 Monarchy of New Zealand
 Māori King Movement

Papua New Guinea

 Monarchy of Papua New Guinea

Solomon Islands

Monarchy of the Solomon Islands

Tahiti

Kingdom of Tahiti

Tonga

List of monarchs of Tonga

Tuvalu

Monarchy of Tuvalu

References

External links
 The Monarchist League
 Theodore's Royalty and Monarchy Site
 IMC, official site of the International Monarchist Conference.
 SYLM, Support Your Local Monarch, the independent monarchist community.

Dynasties
 List
Politics-related lists
Royalty-related lists